Lake Kovdozero is a large freshwater lake in the southern Murmansk Oblast, northwestern part of Russia. There are many islands in the lake. The hydroelectric power plant was built in 1955, thus transforming the lake to the dam. The surface area of Kovdozero has risen from 224 to 294 km2 to 608 km2. Many rivers empty into Kovdozero and it flows to the White Sea through the river Kovda. The lake is used to fishery, water transport and timber rafting.

Lakes of Murmansk Oblast
LKovdozero